β-2-Thienylalanine is an amino acid containing a thiophene side chain. It is a phenylalanine antagonist used in the Guthrie test.

References

Amino acids